Bajo un mismo rostro (English title: Single Identity) is a Mexican telenovela produced by Christian Bach and Humberto Zurita for Televisa in 1995.

Christian Bach, Alfredo Adame and Saúl Lisazo starred as protagonists, while Carlos Cámara, Roberto Blandón and Nuria Bages starred as antagonists.

Plot  
Irene Saldívar is a young woman, beautiful and rich, who suffers a great emotional shock after the death of her father and brother. When she recovers, Irene travels to Greece with her beloved nanny Rosario to free herself from bad memories. During her trip, the young woman meets Alexis Teodorakis, a wealthy Greek businessman with whom she falls madly in love. Both decide to get married without knowing that Carlos Gorostiaga, the administrator of Irene's fortune, has other plans for them.

Carlos, who was always in charge of the finances of the late Melchor Saldívar, Irene's father, is now in charge of directing the fortune of the young woman, who considers him an honest and trustworthy man. But the reality is different, since Carlos is an ambitious and unscrupulous man who, before his wife, Luciana Mendoza, and Irene herself pretends to be a good person. However, Carlos works in the company of Alejandro Roldán; the two seduce rich women and then kill them and keep their money.

Alejandro is as mean as Carlos; He lives in Morelia with his wife, Laura Limantur, who loves him obsessively and who is also complicit in her husband's crimes. Ramiro also lives with them, their son, who is completely unaware of his parents' activities. Ramiro always regrets the absence of his father and whoever wants to control his future, because his father wants to force him to work with him in family businesses when he wants to be a musician.

Carlos and Alejandro plan the death of Alexis so that Alejandro later falls in love with Irene. Their filthy purposes pay off when Alexis dies in an explosion on his yacht. Irene, who has become pregnant with Alexis's baby, returns heartbroken to Mexico and there she receives the help of Diego Covarrubias, the doctor who treated her father and brother when they died. They both fall in love, but new obstacles appear: Estelita, Diego's sickly daughter, is too attached to the memory of her late mother Magdalena, and refuses to let another woman take her place. In addition, Irene discovers that her friend Carolina has always been in love with Diego and decides to move away to leave her place for her friend, since Carolina is ill with cancer and her diagnosis is short-lived.

Alejandro, meanwhile, has become obsessed with Irene; and failing to earn her love, he decides to blackmail her by threatening to take away her son if she does not agree to marry him.

Cast 
 
Christian Bach as Irene de la Concepcion Saldívar Bustamante de Teodorakis
Alfredo Adame as Diego Covarrubias Escobedo
Saúl Lisazo as Alexis Teodorakis Montoya
Carlos Cámara as Carlos Gorostiaga (Villain)
Magda Guzmán as Rosario Montez
Rosario Gálvez as Luciana Mendoza de Gorostiaga
Lorena Rojas as Carolina Zurbarán Castro
Luis Aguilar as Father Tomás
Ernesto Alonso as Melchor Saldívar
Nuria Bages as Laura Limantur de Roldán (Main female villain)
Roberto Blandón as Alejandro Roldán (Main male villain)
Anthony Álvarez as Father Lorenzo
Aurora Clavel as Lupita
Tomás Goros as Renato
Virginia Gutiérrez as Esther Castro de Zurbarán
Josafat Luna as Franco Rosetti
Marifer Malo as Estelita Covarrubias Robledo
Ramón Menéndez as Andrés Ballesteros
Raquel Olmedo as Cassandra Montoya Vda. de Teodorakis
Frances Ondiviela as Melisa Papandreu
Ramiro Orci as Arnulfo
David Ostrosky as Rubén Montesinos
Rodrigo Oviedo as Ramiro Roldán Limantur
Fabián Robles as Teo
Mayra Rojas as Sandra Carballido
Isabel Salazar as Ana María
Roberto Sen as Cristóbal
Juan Soler as Marcelo Saldívar Bustamante
Silvia Suárez as Cristina Beristáin
Sergio Sánchez as Héctor Kazan

Special performances
Manuel Ojeda as Dr. Santillán
Ernesto Yáñez as Dr. Ramírez
Krysta Wesche as Irene (child)
Ramiro Torres as Marcelo (child)
Luis Couturier as Vicente
Alejandra Procuna as Sonia
Anaís as Ana María
Dinorah Cavazos as Iris
Cecilia Gabriela as Magdalena Robledo de Covarrubias
Adriana Fierro as Florencia
Carmelita González as Lucía
Marco Uriel as Marinero espía
Guy de Saint Cyr as Yacht captain
Jorge Molina as Matías
José Antonio Marroz as Dr. Frangos
Guillermo García Cantú as Announcer
Fernando Balzaretti as Newsreader
Rodrigo Abed as Mario Contreras
Melba Luna as Doña Chole
Alejandro Tommasi as Manuel Gorostiaga Mendoza
Adriana Barraza as Silvana
Rolando de Castro as Inspector Araoz
José María Calvario as Malanchi
Blas García as Isidro
Humberto Zurita as Sebastián Obregón
Roberto Ballesteros as César
María Eugenia Ríos as Mother Esperanza
José Roberto Hill as Ralph
Ignacio López Tarso
Gerardo Zurita
Roberto Miquel
Thelma Dorantes
Lucía Paillés
Arsenio Campos
José Carlos Teruel
Fernando Torres Lapham
Rocío Gallardo
Audrey Vera
Claudio Sorel
Javier Díaz Dueñas
Tito Guízar
Queta Carrasco
Julio Monterde
Guillermo Rivas
Lourdes Reyes
Eduardo Noriega
Margarita Magaña
Víctor González
Raúl Castellanos
Ninel Conde

Awards

References

External links

1995 telenovelas
Mexican telenovelas
1995 Mexican television series debuts
1995 Mexican television series endings
Spanish-language telenovelas
Television shows set in Mexico City
Television shows set in Athens
Televisa telenovelas